VFI may stand for:

Vintners' Federation of Ireland, an association of publicans
Volunteer Functions Inventory, a research framework for studying volunteer motivations
Volunteers for Israel, an American non-profit organization that volunteers to do civilian work on Israeli Defense Force bases
Voltage and Frequency Independent, a class of uninterruptible power supply